Truett may refer to:

 Truett (name)
 Truett-McConnell College, college in Cleveland, Georgia
 USS Truett (FF-1095), ship
 George W. Truett Theological Seminary, Baptist theological seminary in Waco, Texas
 Alpheus Truett House, house in Franklin, Tennessee
 Weakley-Truett-Clark House, house in Nashville, Tennessee